Hubert Davis is a basketball player.

Hubert Davis may also refer to:

Hubert Davis (artist)
Hubert Davis (filmmaker)
Hubert Davis, a Madison County, North Carolina sheriff who refused to leave office after losing the 1950 Madison County Sheriff election

See also
Bert Davis (disambiguation)
Hubert Davies, British playwright and director